Judson, North Carolina may refer to:

Judson, Cumberland County, North Carolina
Judson, Swain County, North Carolina